The National Basketball Federation of the Republic of Kazakhstan is the governing body of the sport of basketball in Kazakhstan. It organises the Kazakhstan Basketball Championship and the Kazakhstan Basketball Cup.

Since February 2017, Dimash Dossanov serves as president of the organization. Abay Alpamysov previously served as president of the organization.

References

Basketball
Basketball in Kazakhstan